The Israeli Ministry of Foreign Affairs (translit. Misrad HaHutz) is one of the most important ministries in the Israeli government. The ministry's role is to implement Israel's foreign policy, and promote economic, cultural, and scientific relations with other countries.

The Ministry of Foreign Affairs is located in the government complex in Givat Ram, Jerusalem. Eli Cohen currently holds the Foreign Ministry post.

History
In the early months of 1948, when the government of the future State of Israel was being formed, the Ministry of Foreign Affairs was housed in a building in the abandoned Templer village of Sarona, on the outskirts of Tel Aviv. Moshe Sharett, formerly head of the Political Department of the Jewish Agency, was placed in charge of foreign relations, with Walter Eytan as Director General.

In November 2013, the longest labor dispute in the history of the Foreign Ministry’s workers union came to an end when diplomats signed an agreement that would increase their salaries and improve their working conditions. A new organization was founded, the Israeli Association for Diplomacy, with the mission of promoting the interests of Foreign Ministry staff. In response to issues raised, MK Ronen Hoffman arranged for the Knesset to launch a caucus entitled the “Caucus for the strengthening of the foreign service and Israeli diplomacy” in December 2014. Joined by politicians across the political spectrum, Hoffman said, “As long as the security establishment and the army are preferred over the foreign service, national security is damaged. A country whose foreign service doesn’t take a central position doesn’t act in the best national interest.”

Diplomatic relations
Israel maintains diplomatic relations with 159 countries. It operates 77 embassies, 19 consulates-general and 5 special missions: a mission to the United Nations (New York), a mission to the United Nations institutions in Geneva, a mission to the United Nations institutions in Paris, a mission to the United Nations institutions in Vienna and an ambassador to the European Union (Brussels).

In October 2000, Morocco, Tunisia and the Sultanate of Oman closed the Israeli offices in their countries and suspended relations with Israel. Niger, which renewed relations with Israel in November 1996, severed them in April 2002. Venezuela and Bolivia severed diplomatic ties with Israel in January 2009, in the wake of the IDF operation against Hamas in Gaza.

Foreign ministry building
The new building of the Israeli Ministry of Foreign Affairs in Kiryat Ben-Gurion, the government complex near the Knesset, was designed by Jerusalem architects Kolker, Kolker and Epstein in association with Diamond, Donald, Schmidt & Co. of Toronto. The building consists of three wings: One houses the offices of the Foreign Minister and director-general, another houses the diplomatic corps and the library, and the third is used for receptions. The outside walls of the reception hall incorporate onyx plates that diffuse an amber light. In June 2001, the design won the prize for excellence from the Royal Institute of Architects of Canada. The building is described as a "sophisticated essay in the play between solid and void, mass and volume, and light and shadow."

List of ministers
The Foreign Affairs Minister of Israel (Sar HaHutz) is the political head of the Israeli Ministry of Foreign Affairs. The position is one of the most important in the Israeli cabinet after Prime Minister and Defense Minister.

Deputy ministers

See also

Foreign relations of Israel

References

External links

Official website 
Official website 
Official website 
Official website 
All Ministers in the Ministry of Foreign Affairs Knesset website 

Foreign Affairs
Ministry of Foreign
Foreign Affairs
 
Foreign relations of Israel
Israel
1948 establishments in Israel